Caloocan's 3rd congressional district is one of the three congressional districts of the Philippines in the city of Caloocan. It has been represented in the House of Representatives of the Philippines since 2022. The district consists of eleven barangays in the northeastern portion of Caloocan: Barangays 178 to 188 in Zones 15 and 16. It is currently represented in the 19th Congress by Dean Asistio, who ran under PDP–Laban in the 2022 general election but took his oath as member of Lakas–CMD before the opening of the said legislative period.

Barangays that composed the third district were previously part of the first district since its creation in 1987 until 2021 when Republic Act No. 11545 was signed into law. Dean Asistio was proclaimed as its first representative and currently serves as its district representative.

Representation history

Election results

2022

See also
Legislative districts of Caloocan

References

Congressional districts of the Philippines
Politics of Caloocan
2022 establishments in the Philippines
Congressional districts of Metro Manila
Constituencies established in 2022